Statistics of the American Soccer League II for the 1973 season.

League standings

Playoffs

Bracket

Semifinals

Final

References

American Soccer League II (RSSSF)

	

American Soccer League (1933–1983) seasons
2